This is a list of lighthouses in the British Virgin Islands.

Light beacons

See also
 Lists of lighthouses and lightvessels

References

External links
 

British Virgin islands
Lighthouses